SS Doric was a British ocean liner operated by White Star Line. She was put into service in 1923. She was the second ship of the company to bear this name. Built by Harland and Wolff in Belfast, she was the company's second and last ship to be exclusively powered by turbines.

A liner of medium size and low speed for the time, and divided into two classes, she was designed to serve Canada, which she did from her being put into service in June 1923 until 1932. She was accompanied on this route by a similar vessel, the SS Regina, which was originally operated by the Dominion Line. This decade of Canadian service unfolded without major incident. When the White Star Line abandoned this route, the Doric was assigned to cruises, meeting with great success with young passengers of the time.

When the company merged with its rival, the Cunard Line, the Doric was retained in the new fleet. However, a collision with another ship in September 1935 sealed her fate. Severely damaged and economically irreparable, despite her young age, the company decided to have her scrapped. She was taken to the scrapyard at the end of that same year.

Design
The Doric was a medium-sized liner for its time, 183 meters long, 20 meters wide and 16,484 GRT. With four decks, she had two masts and two funnels. These were in the colors of the White Star Line, ocher-brown topped by a black cuff, while the ship's hull was black, with a base of red anti-rust paint and a white superstructure. Her profile was, in general, very similar to that of the Pittsburgh and the Regina built shortly before by the Harland & Wolff shipyards. The liner was fitted with nine holds, and was able to carry 583 cabin-class passengers and 1,688 third-class passengers on her debut.

Along with the Vedic, the Doric was the second ship of the White Star Line to be powered exclusively by turbines. Like all of the company's ships until the Britannic, its propulsion unit was powered by coal and not fuel oil. The liner was not designed to reach high speeds and sailed at an average of 15 knots using two propellers.

In cabin class, the cabins were decorated in the Louis XVI style, the largest being three-room suites. Third-class cabins were designed for two, three or four passengers. An orchestra played in the dining room and hostesses were responsible for looking after unaccompanied young women and children. From 1926, the Doric could carry 320 cabin class passengers, 657 in tourist class and 537 in third. During the overhaul which reorganized her cabins, the imposing davits (large cranes capable of lowering many boats in succession, tested in particular on the Britannic of 1915), were replaced by more classic davits of the Welin type, used on the most of the company's liners.

History

Construction and service to Canada
Before World War I, the International Mercantile Marine Co. ordered Harland and Wolff shipyards to build several ships for its companies. The first two, the Regina and the Pittsburgh, started in 1913, were completed after the war and put into service in the early 1920s. The Doric was the third ship built on this model and a fourth, slightly larger, the Laurentic, would follow in 1927. The keel of the Doric was laid long after the war has ended, in 1921, and she was launched on 8 August 1922, and delivered on 29 May 1923.

She made her maiden voyage between Liverpool and Montreal via Quebec on the following 8 June. She then remained on this service for several years, but stopped during winter in Halifax, the St. Lawrence River being frozen and impassable. On this route, she was accompanied by the Regina, similar in appearance but operated by another company, the Dominion Line; the two ships were supposed to provide a joint service between the two companies. The Regina however took the colors of the White Star Line in 1925, when it absorbed the remains of the Dominion Line.

This period of the Doric's career was relatively unstressed. In 1926, her accommodation, originally intended only for the cabin class and the third class, was revised to integrate a tourist class. On 14 September 1927, the bow of the liner was damaged in Montreal by the British ship Barrie, but rapid repairs enabled her to reach Liverpool without incident. Another incident occurred on 8 December 1930, when the ship, then undergoing maintenance in the port of Liverpool, was the victim of a fire which affected several of her cabins before being brought under control.

At the beginning of the 1930s, the Great Depression strongly affected the White Star Line, which had to eliminate its less profitable crossings. This was how the Doric, like the Homeric, at the same time, was withdrawn from service, before being reassigned to cruises to bring in some additional funds.

Cruise service and fate
The Doric was still in use after her withdrawal from the Canadian route in October 1932. In April 1933, after several months of waiting in Liverpool, she was assigned to cruises in the Mediterranean Sea. The liner proved to be very popular with a clientele of young people, in particular young couples, which earned it the nickname "Cupid's ship"; she was the scene of no less than nine engagement announcements during a cruise. In 1934, the White Star Line and its rival, the Cunard Line, merged. The Doric was one of the ships to be preserved, and her young age spared her the demolition of certain ships that have become supernumerary. She continued her cruises, departing from Southampton, with very reduced tourist prices: 12 pounds sterling for thirteen days of cruise.

The cruise of 5 September 1935 sealed her fate. She was carrying 736 passengers and 350 crew members and has just made the last stop of her trip in Gibraltar, when she was in a heavy fog off Portugal. During the night, at around 3 AM, she collided with the French vessel Formigny, of the Chargeurs Reunis line, off Cape Finisterre. One of her watertight compartments was flooded, causing her to list to starboard. An SOS was immediately sent out. Women and children were put on lifeboats as a precautionary measure.

Two lifeboats left the ship, but returned an hour later. The distress signals were picked up by two ships, the Orion, an Orient Line ship on her maiden voyage, and the P&O's Viceroy of India, which came to aid. Reassured, passengers were allowed to take personal effects in their cabins, and were served to breakfast in the liner's dining room while waiting for help to arrive. The passenger transfer then went off without a hitch, with part of the crew of the Doric remaining on board. The incident caused no casualty.

Following this collision, Doric had emergency repairs at Vigo, Spain. However, once she returned to England, her damage was determined to be a constructive total loss. She was sold in October 1935 for scrap to John Cashmore Ltd. for £35,000 and subsequently scrapped in November 1935 at Cashmores shipbreaker's yard in Newport, Monmouthshire.

References

Bibliography

Passenger ships of the United Kingdom
Ships of the White Star Line
1922 ships
Ships built in Belfast
Ocean liners of the United Kingdom
Maritime incidents in 1935
Ships built by Harland and Wolff